Tucumcari is a city in and the county seat of Quay County, New Mexico, United States. The population was 5,278 at the 2020 census. Tucumcari was founded in 1901, two years before Quay County was established.

History
In 1901, the Chicago, Rock Island and Pacific Railroad built a construction camp in the western portion of modern-day Quay County. Originally called Ragtown, the camp became known as "Six Shooter Siding", due to numerous gunfights. Its first formal name, Douglas, was used only for a short time. After it grew into a permanent settlement, it was renamed Tucumcari in 1908. The name was taken from Tucumcari Mountain, which is situated near the community. The origin of the mountain's name is uncertain; it may have been derived from the Comanche word tʉkamʉkarʉ, which means 'ambush'. A 1777 burial record mentions a Comanche woman and her child captured in a battle at Cuchuncari, which is believed to be an early version of the name Tucumcari.

In December 1951, a water storage tank collapsed in the city. Four were killed and numerous buildings were destroyed.

Former railroad transit point
Tucumcari until the mid-twentieth century was a junction for transcontinental train service. The Rock Island Railroad ran pool train operations with the Southern Pacific, with transfers at the station (for the Tucumcari-Los Angeles leg of the trip). The Choctaw Rocket (Memphis-Little Rock-Tucumcari-El Paso-Los Angeles) made the switch there (for the coach cars). The Golden State (Chicago-Kansas City-Topeka-Tucumcari-El Paso-Los Angeles) ran continuously through the town.

Geography

Climate
Tucumcari has a cool semi-arid climate (Köppen BSk), characterized by cool winters and hot summers. Rainfall is relatively low except during the summer months, when thunderstorms associated with the North American monsoon can bring locally heavy downpours. Due to the frequency of low humidity, wide daily temperature variations are normal.

Demographics

As of the census of 2000, there were 5,989 people, 2,489 households, and 1,607 families residing in the city. The population density was 793.8 people per square mile (306.7/km). There were 3,065 housing units at an average density of 406.2 per square mile (156.9/km). The racial makeup of the city was 75.87% White, 1.29% African American, 1.39% Native American, 1.20% Asian, 0.22% Pacific Islander, 17.10% from other races, and 2.94% from two or more races. Hispanic or Latino of any race were 51.41% of the population.

There were 2,489 households, out of which 29.8% had children under the age of 18 living with them, 45.4% were married couples living together, 15.3% had a female householder with no husband present, and 35.4% were non-families. 31.7% of all households were made up of individuals, and 14.7% had someone living alone who was 65 years of age or older. The average household size was 2.35 and the average family size was 2.93.

In the city, the population was spread out, with 26.0% under the age of 18, 7.5% from 18 to 24, 24.2% from 25 to 44, 24.8% from 45 to 64, and 17.5% who were 65 years of age or older. The median age was 39 years. For every 100 females, there were 90.9 males. For every 100 females age 18 and over, there were 86.8 males.

The median income for a household in the city was $22,560, and the median income for a family was $27,468. Males had a median income of $25,342 versus $18,568 for females. The per capita income for the city was $14,786. About 19.1% of families and 24.8% of the population were below the poverty line, including 29.5% of those under age 18 and 16.7% of those age 65 or over.

Arts and culture
The buildings formerly at Metropolitan Park (locally known as "Five Mile Park" because it is located about five miles (8 km) outside of town) were designed by Trent Thomas, adapted from his design of La Fonda Hotel in Santa Fe. The park once featured New Mexico's largest outdoor swimming pool. Owing to deterioration, Metropolitan Park was named to the New Mexico Heritage Preservation Alliance's list of Most Endangered for 2003. In 2010, the park's main building caught fire and burnt to the ground. The city of Tucumcari razed the site weeks after the fire.

In 2014, a series of suspicious fires destroyed abandoned buildings, including the Tucumcari Motel, Payless Motel, and a house in the 500 block of North Fourth Street. A former Tucumcari Police Department officer and several others have been charged with arson.

The town formerly hosted an air show each year. The show held on October 4, 2006, was canceled after one hour when a single-engine plane crashed, resulting in the pilot's death.

Tucumcari Tonite, Route 66, and tourism

For many years, Tucumcari has been a popular stop for cross-country travelers on Interstate 40 (formerly U.S. Route 66 in the area). It is the largest city on the highway between Amarillo, Texas and Albuquerque, New Mexico. Billboards reading "TUCUMCARI TONITE!" placed along I-40 for many miles to the east and west of the town invite motorists to stay the night in one of Tucumcari's "2000" (later changed to "1200") motel rooms. The "TUCUMCARI TONITE!" campaign was abandoned in favor of a campaign which declared Tucumcari, "Gateway to the West". However, on June 24, 2008, Tucumcari's Lodgers Tax Advisory Board, the group responsible for the billboards, voted to return to the previous slogan.

Old U.S. Route 66 runs through the heart of Tucumcari via Route 66 Boulevard, which was previously known as Tucumcari Boulevard from 1970 to 2003 and as Gaynell Avenue before that time. Numerous businesses, including gasoline service stations, restaurants, and motels, were constructed to accommodate tourists as they traveled through on the Mother Road. A large number of the vintage motels and restaurants built in the 1930s, 1940s, and 1950s are still in business despite intense competition from newer chain motels and restaurants in the vicinity of Interstate 40, which passes through the city's outskirts on the south.

Tucumcari is the home of over 50 murals. Most were painted by artists Doug and Sharon Quarles and serve as a tourist attraction.

Downtown

Most of Tucumcari's oldest buildings lie along or near Main Street in the Historic Downtown area. These include:
 Rock Island-Southern Pacific Train Station (built 1926, restored 2011)
 Odeon Theatre (built 1937, still operating)
 Crescent Creamery (vacant)
 Masonic Temple (still operating)
 Princess Theater (under renovation)

Also located in the downtown area are the concrete arches that once surrounded the Hotel Vorenburg, which was demolished in the 1970s after being damaged by fire. The Federal Building, commonly known as Sands-Dorsey Drug, was damaged by two fires before finally being demolished in 2015. The location is now a park.

Education
It is a part of the Tucumcari Public Schools school district. Schools in Tucumcari include:
 Tucumcari Early Head Start and Head Start (non-public daycare and preschool)
 Tucumcari Elementary School (public Pre-K through fifth grade)
 Tucumcari Middle School (public sixth grade through eighth grade)
 Tucumcari High School (public ninth grade through twelfth grade)

Tertiary schools:
 Mesalands Community College (community two-year institution of higher learning)

Notable people
In 1896, Tom "Black Jack" Ketchum and his associates robbed a post office and store in Liberty, NM, a community that dissolved after the railroad bypassed it. Many of Liberty's residents moved to the nearby railroad siding that eventually became Tucumcari. Some of the local residents believe that there is a cave in a mesa south of Tucumcari that may hold some loot from the robbery of Liberty, New Mexico.
Musician Bob Scobey was born in Tucumcari in 1916. 
American character actor Paul Brinegar was born in Tucumcari.
Tucumcari High School graduate Stan David was a star safety for the Texas Tech Red Raiders and played 16 NFL games for the Buffalo Bills in 1984. He was listed as number 48 in the Sports Illustrated list of "The 50 Greatest New Mexico Sports Figures".
Rex Maddaford, who competed for the New Zealand team in the 1968 Summer Olympics, has been a long-time Tucumcari Public Schools faculty member.

In popular culture 

 Many of the scenes in the television show Rawhide (1959–1966) starring Clint Eastwood were shot in the Tucumcari area. Paul Brinegar, who played Wishbone, was from Tucumcari.
 Tucumcari is the setting of one of the first scenes in Sergio Leone's 1965 film For a Few Dollars More, starring Clint Eastwood, Lee Van Cleef, and Gian Maria Volonté. This is a prochronism, as Tucumcari was founded many years after the historical period in which For a Few Dollars More takes place.
 A scene in the 1971 movie Two-Lane Blacktop, starring James Taylor, Dennis Wilson, and Warren Oates, was filmed at a gasoline service station on U.S. Highway 54 just northeast of Tucumcari. Tucumcari Mountain is clearly visible at the beginning of this scene. 
 In the David Stone Series featuring Micah Dalton, the lead character was raised in Tucumcari.
 Scenes for the film, Hell or High Water, were filmed in Tucumcari on June 1, 2015.
 A segment of the 2018 movie The Ballad of Buster Scruggs centers around an unsuccessful attempt to rob a bank in Tucumcari.
A plot strand in season 5 of AMC’s Better Call Saul, the prequel to Breaking Bad, revolves around legal battles to oust a resident from his house near Tucumcari so that Mesa Verde, Kim’s client, can build a call center there.
 The USS Tucumcari (PGH-2) hydrofoil was built by Boeing and began service in 1968.  It was decommissioned in 1972 after running aground in Puerto Rico.
 In Barry Levinson's Rain Man, Tom Cruise says he's in Tucumcari while on a payphone.
 Tucumcari is referenced in the song Willin' by the Country Rock band Little Feat.

See also
 National Register of Historic Places listings in Quay County, New Mexico
 Baca–Goodman House (former listing)
 Blue Swallow Motel
 Cactus Motor Lodge (structure no longer exists)

References

External links

 City of Tucumcari
 Tucumcari Chamber of Commerce

 
Cities in New Mexico
County seats in New Mexico
Cities in Quay County, New Mexico
Populated places established in 1901